(Tell, my tongue), WAB 31, is a sacred motet composed by Anton Bruckner in . It is a setting of the first strophe of the Latin hymn Pange lingua for the celebration of Corpus Christi.

History 
Bruckner composed the motet in  when, as eleven-year-old boy, he was studying by Johann Baptist Weiß in Hörsching. It is not known whether it was performed at that time. In 1891, towards the end of his life, Bruckner "restored" this beloved very first composition.

The first version of the work, the original manuscript of which is lost, was found as a transcription by Franz Bayer, Steyr. The transcription of the first version and the manuscript of the 1891 version are stored in the archive of the Österreichische Nationalbibliothek.

The second version of the motet was first published as a facsimile in 1927 by Max Auer in his book . The first version was first published in band II/1, p. 228 of the Göllerich/Auer biography.

Music 
The work is a setting of 28 bars in C major of the first verse of the Pange lingua for mixed choir a cappella.

On 19 April 1891 Bruckner made some "restoration" of the work. The differences between the two versions are small, mainly a different articulation in bars 15 and 22, and a reharmonisation of bars 25-27.

Discography

First version 
There is a single commercial recording of the first version:
 Philipp von Steinäcker, Vocalensemble Musica Saeculorum, Bruckner: Pange lingua - Motetten - CD: Fra Bernardo FB 1501271, 2015

Second version 
There is a single recording of the 1891 version:
 Jonathan Brown, Ealing Abbey Choir,  Anton Bruckner: Sacred Motets – CD: Herald HAVPCD 213, 1997

References

Sources 
 Max Auer, Anton Bruckner als Kirchenmusiker, G. Bosse, Regensburg, 1927
 August Göllerich, Anton Bruckner. Ein Lebens- und Schaffens-Bild,  – posthumous edited by Max Auer by G. Bosse, Regensburg, 1932
 Anton Bruckner – Sämtliche Werke, Band XXI: Kleine Kirchenmusikwerke, Musikwissenschaftlicher Verlag der Internationalen Bruckner-Gesellschaft, Hans Bauernfeind and Leopold Nowak (Editor), Vienna, 1984/2001
 Uwe Harten, Anton Bruckner. Ein Handbuch. Residenz Verlag, Salzburg, 1996. .
 Cornelis van Zwol, Anton Bruckner 1824–1896 – Leven en werken, uitg. Thoth, Bussum, Netherlands, 2012. 
 Crawford Howie, Anton Bruckner - A documentary biography, online revised edition

External links 
  - Both versions
 Pange lingua C-Dur, WAB 31 Critical discography by Hans Roelofs 
 A live performance of the first version of the motet by the Vocalensemble b-choired of Linz (26 April 2014) can be heard on YouTube: Pange lingua, WAB 31

Motets by Anton Bruckner
1835 compositions
1891 compositions
Compositions in A minor